Georges Henri Manzana Pissarro (1871–1961) was a French artist who worked in Impressionist and Post-Impressionist styles. He was also a designer of textiles, decorative objects, furniture and glassware.

Biography
Georges Henri Manzana Pissarro was born in 1871 in France, at Louveciennes, the third child of Impressionist artist Camille Pissarro. Initially, he painted at his father's side, where he learned not only to handle brush and pencil but also to observe and to love nature. Like his brother Lucien Pissarro he spent his formative years surrounded by distinguished artists of the Impressionist movement, such as Monet, Cézanne, Renoir and Gauguin, all of whom frequented the Pissarro home.

As a young man he painted a series of landscapes around Pontoise and Eragny in Impressionist style which he adopted from his father. Around 1906 Manzana started to search for other means of expression via the design of decorative objects and furniture. The influence of Gauguin’s exotic native scenes from Tahiti and Martinique contributed to the development of his Orientalism, which at that time began to manifest itself in some of his works by his experimenting with gold, silver and copper paint.

At the beginning of the 20th century Georges  regularly exhibited his Post-Impressionist works at the ‘Salon d’Automne’ and the ‘Salon des Indépendents’, as well as Durand Ruel and Druet in Paris. In 1907 exhibited for the first time his decorative works at Vollard. His most important exhibition during his career was in 1914 at the Musée des Arts Décoratifs where he exhibited 311 works including tapestries, carpets, furniture, glassware, decorative paintings, etchings and lithographs.

The Artist continued to exhibit his work regularly until the late 1930s, splitting his time between Les Andelys and Paris, although spending several summers at Pont-Aven in Brittany, where the local costume and lifestyle inspired a series of paintings in the 1930s. At the declaration of war in 1939, he moved together with his family to Casablanca where he stayed until 1947.

Manzana’s youngest son, Félix, also became an accomplished artist. Manzana spent the last years of his life with him in Menton, returning to his Post-Impressionist roots and painting the local landscape.

See also 

 Camille Pissarro, father of Georges Manzana-Pissarro
 Lucien Pissarro, brother of Georges Manzana-Pissarro
 List of French artists
 List of Orientalist artists

References

External links 
  "Gallery of works by Georges Manzana-Pissarro" on latelierdutemps.com
  Drawings by Georges Manzana Pissarro- on lagravure.com
  Works of Georges Manzana-Pissarro on pissarro.net

Georges Henri Manzana
1871 births
1961 deaths
19th-century French painters
20th-century French painters
20th-century French male artists
French male painters
19th-century French Sephardi Jews
20th-century French Sephardi Jews
Jewish painters
Orientalist painters
French people of Portuguese-Jewish descent
People from Yvelines
Sibling artists
19th-century French male artists